Bamu, or Bamu Kiwai, is a Papuan language of southern Papua New Guinea.

A thousand speakers of Gama are included in the ISO code for Bamu. However, Ethnologue notes that lexical similarity is below 80% with the most similar dialect of Bamu proper.

Dialects
Dialects are:
Gama
Lower Bamu
Sisiame
Upper Bamu (Middle Bamu)
Nuhiro

References

Kiwaian languages
Languages of Western Province (Papua New Guinea)